"Rake It Up" is a song recorded by American rapper Yo Gotti from his collaborative mixtape with record producer Mike WiLL Made-It titled Gotti Made-It (2017), featuring vocals by Nicki Minaj. The song also serves as the lead single from Gotti's ninth studio album, I Still Am. Produced by Mike WiLL Made-It and 30 Roc, the song was released on June 1, 2017. The song's music video premiered August 21 on Tidal, and was subsequently released on YouTube on August 26. The song peaked at number eight on the US Billboard Hot 100, making it Yo Gotti's first top 10 entry and most successful single to date. The song interpolates Too Short's Freaky Tales.

Background and release
After collaborating on "5 Star" (Remix), "Coca Coca" and "Down in the DM" (Remix); "Rake It Up" marks the fourth time Yo Gotti and Nicki Minaj have worked together on a recording. To promote the song, Gotti, on May 30, 2017, teased the song on his Snapchat during a private boat party. Minaj also played a snippet of the song on May 31, 2017, via her Instagram account, confirming that the track would be released the following day at midnight . Soon after the song was announced, critics wrote how Minaj was probably trying to "steal a little of her ex-boyfriend's (Meek Mill) thunder", since he was very recently featured on another Yo Gotti song called "Top Lookin Down". On June 1, 2017, the song premiered online and was released worldwide as a download.

Music video
The music video for the song premiered August 21, 2017, on Tidal, but was subsequently released on YouTube on August 26. It was shot in Miami, and features a guest appearance from Blac Chyna.

Remixes 
On July 17, 2017, DJ Funky released his remix of the song featuring new verses from American rappers Too $hort & T.I. Another remix titled "Rake It Up (MidWest Remix)" was uploaded to DJ Funky's official YouTube channel on August 8, 2017, and features new verses from American rappers Rich The Factor and The Popper. American rapper Plies released his remix of the song on YouTube. Colombian reggaeton artist Farina released her Spanish remix of the song on her official SoundCloud account on November 11, 2017.

Live performances
On September 14, 2017, Gotti and Minaj performed the song on The Tonight Show Starring Jimmy Fallon. Minaj also performed the song during her Rolling Loud Festival performance on May 13, 2018, in Miami, preceded by "Chun-Li" and "MotorSport".

Track listing
 Digital download
 "Rake It Up" (featuring Nicki Minaj) – 4:36

 Digital download – Diplo & Party Favor Remix
 "Rake It Up" (Diplo & Party Favor Remix) (featuring Nicki Minaj) – 2:52

 Digital download – Y2K Remix
"Rake It Up" (Y2K Remix) (featuring Nicki Minaj) – 4:08

Charts

Weekly charts

Year-end charts

Certifications

Release history

See also 
 List of Billboard Rhythmic number-one songs of the 2010s

References

External links
 

2017 songs
2017 singles
Yo Gotti songs
Nicki Minaj songs
Songs written by Yo Gotti
Songs written by Mike Will Made It
Songs written by Nicki Minaj
Song recordings produced by Mike Will Made It
Songs written by Too Short